Vernon Thomas Morgan (August 8, 1928 – November 8, 1975) was an American third baseman and coach in Major League Baseball, and a manager and longtime player (1948–64) at the minor league level.

Morgan's Major League playing career consisted of 31 games and 71 at bats for the 1954–1955 Chicago Cubs. Morgan collected 16 hits, including two doubles, and drove in three runs, batting .225. In 1956, he was acquired by the Washington Senators organization, and he would spend the rest of his baseball career in the employ of the franchise (which became the Minnesota Twins in 1961). Morgan played for the Senators' Double-A farm club, the Chattanooga Lookouts of the Southern Association, from 1956 through mid-1960. As a 28-year-old veteran, Morgan had his best minor-league season for the 1957 Lookouts, batting .332 with 14 home runs and 92 RBI and making the SA all-star team as an outfielder.

Morgan would play in the minor leagues for 15 seasons and bat .301 in 5,273 at bats, but he never made Washington's Major League roster and in 1961 he became a manager in the newly relocated Twins' farm system. Morgan managed for eight seasons in the Alabama–Florida League, Northern League and Carolina League — compiling a won/loss mark of 488–540 (.475) — until he was appointed to the Minnesota MLB coaching staff for 1969. He served as the Twins' first base coach for almost seven seasons, until he was forced to the sidelines by kidney disease in September 1975. Morgan received a kidney transplant during the autumn of 1975, but his body rejected it and he died in Minneapolis on November 8 at the age of 47.

References

 Marcin, Joe, ed., The Official 1970 Baseball Register. St. Louis: The Sporting News, 1970.

External links

 

1928 births
1975 deaths
Baseball coaches from Virginia
Baseball players from Virginia
Bismarck-Mandan Pards players
Charlotte Hornets (baseball) players
Chattanooga Lookouts players
Chicago Cubs players
Deaths from kidney disease
Des Moines Bruins players
Fort Walton Beach Jets players
Kidney transplant recipients
Los Angeles Angels (minor league) players
Macon Peaches players
Major League Baseball first base coaches
Major League Baseball third basemen
Minnesota Twins coaches
Minor league baseball managers
Nashville Vols players
People from Emporia, Virginia
Richmond Spiders baseball players
Selma Cloverleafs players
Springfield Cubs players